The 1982–83 Syracuse Orangemen basketball team represented Syracuse University during the 1982–83 college basketball season. The team was led by 7th-year head coach Jim Boeheim and played their home games at the Carrier Dome in Syracuse, New York.

The Orange handed the vaunted "Phi Slama Jama" team from Houston its first loss of the season (and one of only 3 losses total) in front of 19,430 at the Carrier Dome on December 11, 1982.

Roster

Schedule

|-
!colspan=9 style=| Regular Season

|-
!colspan=9 style=| Big East tournament

|-
!colspan=9 style=| NCAA Tournament

Rankings

References

Syracuse Orange
Syracuse Orange men's basketball seasons
Syracuse
Syracuse Orange
Syracuse Orange